Varifula trancasiana is a species of moth of the family Tortricidae. It is found in the Bío Bío Region of Chile.

The wingspan is 15 mm. The ground colour of the forewings is clear white with brownish markings with dark brown and blackish brown spots mainly along the edges. The hindwings are pale grey brown, but paler basally.

Etymology
The species name refers to the type locality.

References

Moths described in 2010
Euliini
Moths of South America
Taxa named by Józef Razowski
Endemic fauna of Chile